India Elements is an event and artist management company founded in 2009 with headquarters in Cochin, India. The company specializes in live music and cultural events around the world.

History

India Elements was founded in 2004 by Manoj K Varghese, who managed the company as a cultural facilitator. In 2009, it expanded into an organized event and artist management firm.

Charity
The firm and its founder Manoj K Varghese, who had been the secretary to celebrated artist M.F Husain, is actively involved in charity events. He was the chairman of the Kerala Auxiliary Force, which is a non-profit organization that takes care of the needy. The firm regularly holds charity events that include blood donation camps, charity events for the Dalits, helping Non Resident Indians, healthcare events, and charity music events.

Notable events

References

External links
 Official Website

Event management companies of India